KDRS (1490 MHz) is an AM radio station broadcasting a mainstream rock format. Licensed to Paragould, Arkansas, United States, it serves the Jonesboro area.  The station is currently owned by Mor Media, Inc.

External links

DRS
Radio stations established in 1962